The Stonewall Workplace Equality Index is a ranking list of British employers compiled annually by the lesbian, gay, bisexual and transgender equality charity and training provider Stonewall. It is advertised as a "definitive list showcasing the best employers for lesbian, gay, bi and trans staff".

Companies are not automatically included in the list but have to opt in by forwarding detailed documentation to Stonewall; the number actually participating is between 400 and 500 of which only the ranking of the top 100 is made public.

The algorithm used to compile the list is not disclosed to the public, but Stonewall claims to have surveyed 91,248 employees directly for the 2017 edition of the list.

The index was launched in 2005 as the Corporate Equality Index, changing its name to Workplace Equality Index in 2006.

Results

See also

 Stonewall
 Equality Act 2010
 Corporate Equality Index, maintained for U.S. businesses by the Human Rights Campaign
 Nolan Investigates

References

2005 establishments in the United Kingdom
LGBT history in the United Kingdom
Statistical indicators